The 2009 Champion Hurdle was a horse race held at Cheltenham Racecourse on Tuesday 10 March 2009. It was the 79th running of the Champion Hurdle.

The winner was Raymond Tooth's Punjabi, a six-year-old gelding trained in Berkshire by Nicky Henderson and ridden by Barry Geraghty. The victory was Henderson's fourth in the race, following See You Then in 1985, 1986 and 1987, and a first in the race for Geraghty..

Punjabi won at odds of 22/1 by a neck from the Triumph Hurdle winner Celestial Halo. The field included four previous winners of the race: Hardy Eustace (2004, 2005), Brave Inca (2006), Sublimity (2007) and Katchit (2008). Twenty-one of the twenty-three runners completed the course.

Race details
 Sponsor: Smurfit Kappa
 Purse: £370,000; First prize: £210,937
 Going: Good to Soft
 Distance: 2 miles 110 yards
 Number of runners: 23
 Winner's time: 4m 00.90

Full result

 Abbreviations: nse = nose; nk = neck; hd = head; dist = distance; UR = unseated rider; PU = pulled up

Winner's details
Further details of the winner, Punjabi.
 Sex: Gelding
 Foaled: 3 April 2003
 Country: Great Britain
 Sire: Komaite; Dam: Competa (Hernando)
 Owner: Raymond Tooth
 Breeder: J. H. Wilson

References

Champion Hurdle
 2009
Champion Hurdle
Champion Hurdle
2000s in Gloucestershire